Electronica is an umbrella term that encompasses a broad group of electronic-based styles.

Electronica may also refer to:
Electronica (trade fair), a trade fair for the electronics industry
ElecTRONica, a nighttime event at Disney California Adventure
Two albums by Jean-Michel Jarre:
Electronica 1: The Time Machine
Electronica 2: The Heart of Noise